Rubén Martínez may refer to:

 Rubén Martínez Bulnes (born 1929), Salvadoran sculptor
 Rubén Martínez (writer) (born 1962), American writer
 Rubén Martínez Villena (1899–1934), Cuban writer
 Rubén Martínez (footballer, born 1964), Chilean footballer
 Rubén Martínez Dalmau (born 1970), Spanish politician
 Rubén Martínez (footballer, born 1984), Spanish footballer
 Rubén Martínez Granja (born 1989), Spanish footballer
 Rubén Martínez Puente, Cuban politician